"Folsom Prison Blues" is a song by American singer-songwriter Johnny Cash. Written in 1953, it was first recorded in 1955 for his debut studio album Johnny Cash with His Hot and Blue Guitar! (1957), appearing as the album's eleventh track. Borrowing liberally from Gordon Jenkins' 1953 song, "Crescent City Blues", the song combines elements from two popular folk styles, the train song and the prison song, both of which Cash continued to use for the rest of his career. It was one of Cash's signature songs. Additionally, this recording was included on the compilation album All Aboard the Blue Train (1962). In June 2014, Rolling Stone ranked it No. 51 on its list of the 100 greatest country songs of all time.

Cash performed the song live to a crowd of inmates at Folsom State Prison in 1968 for his live album At Folsom Prison (1968), released through Columbia Records. This version became a No. 1 hit on the country music charts and reached No. 32 on the Billboard Hot 100 in the same year. This version also won the Grammy Award for Best Country Vocal Performance, Male, at the 11th Annual Grammy Awards in 1969.

Original 1955 recording
Cash was inspired to write this song after seeing the movie Inside the Walls of Folsom Prison (1951) while serving in West Germany in the United States Air Force at Landsberg, Bavaria (itself the location of a famous prison). Cash recounted how he came up with the line "But I shot a man in Reno, just to watch him die": "I sat with my pen in my hand, trying to think up the worst reason a person could have for killing another person, and that's what came to mind."

Cash took the melody for the song and many of the lyrics from Gordon Jenkins's 1953 Seven Dreams concept album, specifically the song "Crescent City Blues". Jenkins was not credited on the original record, which was issued by Sun Records. In the early 1970s, after the song became popular, Cash paid Jenkins a settlement of approximately US$75,000 following a lawsuit.

"Folsom Prison Blues" was recorded at the Sun Studio in Memphis, Tennessee on July 30, 1955. The producer was Sam Phillips, and the musicians were Cash (vocals, guitar), Luther Perkins (guitar), and Marshall Grant (bass). Like other songs recorded during his early Sun Records sessions, Cash had no drummer in the studio, but replicated the snare drum sound by inserting a piece of paper (like a dollar bill) under the guitar strings and strumming the snare rhythm on his guitar. The song's sound has been described as country, rockabilly, and rock and roll. The song was released as a single with another song recorded at the same session, "So Doggone Lonesome". Early in 1956, both sides reached No. 4 on the Billboard C&W Best Sellers chart.

When photographer Jim Marshall asked Cash why the song's main character was serving time in California's Folsom Prison after shooting a man in Reno, Nevada, he responded, "That's called poetic license."

Live 1968 recording

Cash opened almost all of his concerts with "Folsom Prison Blues," after greeting the audience with his trademark introduction, "Hello, I'm Johnny Cash," for decades. Cash performed the song at Folsom Prison itself on January 13, 1968, which was recorded and later released as a live album titled At Folsom Prison. That opening version of the song is more up-tempo than the original Sun recording. According to Michael Streissguth, the cheering from the audience following the line "But I shot a man in Reno / just to watch him die" was added in post-production. According to a special feature on the DVD release of the 2005 biopic Walk the Line, the prisoners avoided cheering at any of Cash's comments about the prison itself, fearing reprisal from guards. The performance again featured Cash, Perkins and Grant, as on the original recording, together with W.S. Holland (drums).

Released as a single, the live version reached number 1 on the country singles chart, and number 32 on the Hot 100, in 1968.  Pitchfork Media placed this live version at number 8 on its list of "The 200 Greatest Songs of the 1960s." The live performance of the song won Cash the Grammy Award for Best Country Vocal Performance, Male, the first of four he won in his career, at the 1969 Grammy Awards.

Chart performance
Original version

Live version

Certifications

In popular culture
 Cold Case used the song in Season 2, Episode 4, as part of the case.
 James Gunn used the song in his film The Suicide Squad (2021), during its opening sequence.

Other versions
 Gram Parsons and the International Submarine Band recorded the track in 1967 and it was released on their 1968 album Safe At Home.
 Blues musician Slim Harpo released a version as a single in 1968.
Country legend Ernest Tubb included the song on his 1969 album, Saturday Satan Sunday Saint.
 Organist Lenny Dee includes an instrumental version on his 1969 Decca Records release, Turn Around, Look At Me. It was also released as a promotional 45 RPM single with the title track.
 Jerry Lee Lewis included the song on his 1981 album, Killer Country
 South African singer Ray Dylan included the song on his album Goeie Ou Country - Op Aanvraag.
 Artist Everlast included the song on his album Love, War and the Ghost of Whitey Ford
 Jerry Reed covered and included the song in his 1973 album: Lord, Mr. Ford
The Reverend Horton Heat included the song on their 1999 release Holy Roller.
 Johnny Cash recorded another version of the song in 1988 and it is on his Classic Cash: Hall of Fame Series album.
 German EBM band Accessory featured this track on their 2007 album Underbeat.
 British band Blyth Power released a cover as the B-side of their 1987 single, "Ixion".
 American mashup artist Neil Cicierega mashed this song up with Baby and The Reason on his album Mouth Dreams
 American Reggae band Stick Figure covered the song on their 2009 album Smoke Stack
 American Metalcore band Wage War covered the song on their 2022 album The Stripped Sessions

See also
List of train songs

Notes

References
 Streissguth, Michael. Johnny Cash at Folsom Prison: The Making of a Masterpiece, Da Capo Press (2004). .

External links
 Lyrics of this song at Genius

1955 singles
1968 singles
Songs written by Johnny Cash
Johnny Cash songs
Billboard Hot Country Songs number-one singles of the year
Song recordings produced by Sam Phillips
Songs about California
Songs about trains
Songs about prison
Songs involved in plagiarism controversies
Works subject to a lawsuit
Sun Records singles
Columbia Records singles
1955 songs
American rock-and-roll songs
Rockabilly songs